Thomas Rohrbach (born 4 April 1949) is a retired footballer who played as a midfielder during the 1970s and 1980s.

Career
Rohrbach played for Eintracht Frankfurt in the German first division between 1970 and 1975, winning the German Cup twice. He moved to Greece in the summer of 1975 and played for Ethnikos Piraeus F.C. from 1975 until 1978 and for Olympiacos F.C. from 1978 to 1980.

After the 1980 season, Rohrbach returned to Germany where he played for SSV Ulm 1846 in the German second division, and would end his career with lower league clubs Hessen Bad Hersfeld and FC Rhein-Main.

References

External links
 
Thomas Rohrbach at Eintracht Frankfurt Archive 

1949 births
Living people
German footballers
Eintracht Frankfurt players
SSV Ulm 1846 players
Ethnikos Piraeus F.C. players
Olympiacos F.C. players
Bundesliga players
2. Bundesliga players
Association football midfielders
People from Bad Hersfeld
Sportspeople from Kassel (region)
Footballers from Hesse